The Debrecen Swimming Pool Complex is an aquatics venue in Debrecen, Hungary. The facility features a competitive long course pool, a warm up pool, a training pool, Jacuzzi, sauna and an outdoor thermal bath with a water temperature of 34–36 °C (93–97 °F). The 50 metres long course pool can be reduced to 33 metres or 25 metres by a mobile wall, making it available for short course events.

The construction of the pool began in October 2005 and took 11 months to complete. It was opened in October 2006 with a three-day-long inauguration festival, that included water polo matches and swimming competitions. The opening ceremony featured Tamás Gyárfás, president of the Hungarian Swimming Association and Lajos Kósa, mayor of Debrecen, while the ribbon-cutting ceremony was carried out by five time Olympic champion Krisztina Egerszegi.

The first major event held in the venue was the 2007 European Short Course Swimming Championships, which was followed by a number of national and international swimming and water polo competitions. In February 2012, after Antwerp withdrew from organizing the swimming events 2012 European Aquatics Championships, Debrecen stepped in as the new host and the races are now set to take place at the pool complex between 21 and 27 May 2012.

References

External links

Sports venues completed in 2006
Swimming venues in Hungary
Sports venues in Debrecen